Circuito da Boavista is a street circuit in Porto, Portugal, which was used twice for the Formula One Portuguese Grand Prix. The original course began at the harbor-front "Esplanada do Rio de Janeiro", continued on "Avenida da Boavista", (hence the circuit's name), and then twisted its way through small neighborhoods back to the start-finish line. 

The first Grand Prix was held in 1958, and saw an act of sportsmanship by Stirling Moss. Moss came to the defense of his countryman and title rival Mike Hawthorn, who faced a penalty for having driven towards oncoming traffic after a spin. Moss persuaded the stewards not to disqualify Hawthorn, who retained his second place and 6 points. Hawthorn eventually won the drivers championship by 1 point over Moss.

The 1960 running was a race of attrition, with only four cars finishing within five laps of winner Jack Brabham. Accidents and mechanical problems ended the day early for future champions John Surtees, Phil Hill, Graham Hill and others.

Recent years 
The circuit was revived in 2005, though it was shortened from the original layout, and now measures . Events are held every two years. Besides the Boavista Historic Grand Prix, there are also races for recent car models. In 2007, 2009, 2011 and 2013 the track staged the FIA WTCC Race of Portugal, an event which included in its programme European motorsport categories such as International Formula Master and Portuguese national competitions.

In 2015 the Porto City Council decided to suspend the circuit, saying that following a cut in support from Turismo de Portugal, spending about three million euros on the event would be irresponsible.

Lap records

The official race lap records at the Circuito da Boavista are listed as:

References

External links

Official website  
Satellite picture by Google Maps

Formula One circuits
Portuguese Grand Prix
Motorsport venues in Portugal
Circuit Boavista
World Touring Car Championship circuits